Lynne Bowen (born August 22, 1940 in Indian Head, Saskatchewan) is a Canadian non-fiction writer, historian, professor, and journalist, best known for her popular historical books about Vancouver Island and British Columbia. Over the years, Bowen has won awards such as the Eaton's British Columbia Book Award (1983), the Lieutenant Governor's Medal for Writing British Columbia History (1987), and the Hubert Evans Non-Fiction Prize (1993).

Biography
Lynne Bowen is a graduate of the University of Alberta (1958–1963) where she earned an R.N. in 1962, and a B.Sc. in Public Health Nursing in 1963, before moving to British Columbia in 1972 and raising three children. She continued her studies in history and literature at Vancouver Island University (then Malaspina College) and at the University of Victoria where she completed a Master of Arts in Western Canadian History. In 1980, three weeks after graduation, Bowen was approached by Nanaimo's Coal Tyee Society to write a book based on 105 interviews of Vancouver Island coal miners and their families. Nanaimo coal mines had closed 30 years before and the city had been home to some of the most important coal mines in the world, along with the one of largest explosions in history, the 1887 Nanaimo mine explosion. The miners wanted their oral histories preserved. Bowen compiled those oral histories in her first book, Boss Whistle, and later book, Three Dollar Dreams. The success of these early works garnered Bowen several major literary awards and cultural grants.

Bowen continues to write in the popular history genre, and to date has written seven books, several magazine articles, and penned a monthly newspaper column entitled "Those Island People" in Victoria's Times Colonist (2003–2005), inspired by her years of collecting and chronicling stories and interviews with people on Vancouver Island. From 1993 to 2006, she became Co-Chair of the Maclean Hunter Chair of Creative Nonfiction Writing at the University of British Columbia (later known as the Rogers Communications Chair of Creative Nonfiction Writing), a position she held until 2006.

In 2011, she was in a serious car accident that broke her legs, pelvis, wrist and sternum.

The City of Nanaimo awarded her with the City of Nanaimo Excellence in Culture Award in 2000.

In 2018, Bowen donated her complete archives to Vancouver Island University Library's Special Collections & Archives.

Books
 Boss Whistle: The Coal Miners of Vancouver Island Remember, 1982
 Three Dollar Dreams, 1987
 Muddling Through: The Remarkable Story of the Barr Colonists, 1992
 Those Lake People: Stories of Cowichan Lake, 1995
 Robert Dunsmuir: Laird of the Mines, 1999
 Whoever Gives Us Bread: The Story of Italians in British Columbia, 2011
 Those Island People, 2014

Awards
 F.G. Bressani Literary Prize in Creative Nonfiction (Bressani Award), Winner, 2012
 British Columbia Genealogical Society Family History Book Award, Honourable Mention, 2011
 City of Vancouver Book Award, Shortlist, 2011
 Certificate of Honour, British Columbia Historical Federation Writing Competition, 2000
 Distinguished Alumni Award, Concordia University College of Alberta (now Concordia University of Edmonton), 2000
 City of Nanaimo, Excellence in Culture Award, 1999
 Canadian Historical Association Regional Certificate of Merit, Prairies/Northwest Territories, 1992
 Hubert Evans Non-Fiction Prize, BC Book Prizes, 1992
 Canada Council Non-Fiction Writing Grant, 1989
 Canada Council Non-Fiction Writing Grant, 1985
 Roderick Haig-Brown Regional Prize, Shortlist, 1987
 Lieutenant-Governor's Medal for Writing British Columbia History, 1987 (Lieutenant Governor's Award for Literary Excellence)
 Canadian Historical Association Regional Certificate of Merit, British Columbia, 1983
 Eaton's British Columbia Book Award, 1983
 Canada Council Explorations Grant, 1981

References

External links
 Official website
 Bio at Douglas & McIntyre
 VIU Library Special Collections & Archives

1940 births
Living people
Writers from Saskatchewan
20th-century Canadian women writers
20th-century Canadian non-fiction writers
21st-century Canadian women writers
21st-century Canadian non-fiction writers
Canadian women non-fiction writers